The Santander Golf Tour Valencia is a women's professional golf tournament on Spain's Santander Golf Tour that has featured on the LET Access Series. It was first played in 2012 and is held in Valencia, Spain.

Winners

References

External links

LET Access Series events
Golf tournaments in Spain